The Espraiado River is a river in the south of the state of São Paulo Brazil.
It is a tributary of the Una da Aldeia River.

Course

The river originates in the municipality of Pedro de Toledo, São Paulo.
It flows along the length of the Despraiado Sustainable Development Reserve and then across the Juréia-Itatins Ecological Station.
Known in its lower reaches as the Itinguçu River, it joins the Das Pedras River to form the Una da Aldeia River.

See also
List of rivers of São Paulo

References

Sources

Rivers of São Paulo (state)